East Denmark is a geographical term that refers to the part of Denmark east of Storebælt, including Zealand, Amager, Lolland, Falster, Møn, Bornholm, and Ertholmene. From a linguistic and historical point of view the term refers to the area east of the Øresund (the former Danish territories Scania, Halland and Blekinge and Bornholm). The former dialects in Skåneland are accordingly called East Danish (Østdansk). Inhabitants:2,699,551 (1 July 2021).

Notes

Geography of Denmark
Regions of Denmark